Peter McCullagh  (born 8 January 1952) is a Northern Irish-born American statistician and John D. MacArthur Distinguished Service Professor in the Department of Statistics at the University of Chicago.

Education
McCullagh is from Plumbridge, Northern Ireland. He attended the University of Birmingham and completed his PhD at Imperial College London, supervised by David Cox and Anthony Atkinson.

Research
McCullagh is the coauthor with John Nelder of Generalized Linear Models (1983, Chapman and Hall – second edition 1989), a seminal text on the subject of generalized linear models (GLMs) with more than 23,000 citations.  He also wrote "Tensor Methods in Statistics", published originally in 1987.

Awards and honours
McCullagh is a Fellow of the Royal Society and the American Academy of Arts and Sciences. He won the COPSS Presidents' Award in 1990. He was the recipient of the Royal Statistical Society's Guy Medal in Bronze in 1983 and in Silver in 2005.

He was also the recipient of the inaugural Karl Pearson Prize of the International Statistical Institute, with John Nelder, "for their monograph Generalized Linear Models (1983)". He won a Notable Alumni Award in 2007 from his grammar school, St Columb's College.

References

Fellows of the Royal Society
Fellows of the American Academy of Arts and Sciences
Irish statisticians
People from County Tyrone
Alumni of the University of Birmingham
University of Chicago faculty
Fellows of the American Statistical Association
Living people
People educated at St Columb's College
1952 births
Mathematical statisticians